Richard Stevenson (born 1952) is a Canadian teacher and poet. Stevenson teaches English at Lethbridge College in Lethbridge, Alberta and has taught in Western Canada and Nigeria.

Stevenson has degrees in English and Creative Writing from the University of Victoria and University of British Columbia. Stevenson is also a musician with the young adult group Sasquatch and the jazz/poetry ensemble Naked Ear.

Works

Drving Offensively (1985)
Suiting Up – Third Eye Press (1986)
Whatever it is Plants Dream... (1990)
Learning to Breathe (1992)
From the Mouths of Angels (1993)
Why Were All the Angels Men (1994)
Wiser Pills (HMS Press Books on Disk (1996)
A Murder of Crows: New & Selected Poems (Black Moss Press, 1998)
Nothing Definite Yeti  (Ekstasis Editions, 1999)
Live-Evil: A Homage To Miles Davis (Thistledown Press, 2000)
Hot Flashes: Maiduguri Haiku, Senryu, and Tanka (Ekstasis Editions, 2001)
Take Me To Your Leader!  (Bayeux Arts. Inc.,  2003)A Charm of Finches (Ekstasis Editions, 2004)Parrot With Tourette's (Black Moss Press, Palm Poets Series, 2004)Alex Anklebone & Andy The Dog (picture book, Bayeux Arts Inc., 2005)Flicker at the Fascia (Serengeti Press, 2005)Tempus Fugit (Laurel Reed Books, 2005)Riding on a Magpie Riff (memoir, Black Moss press, 2006)Tidings of Magpies: Haiku, Senryu, and Tanka (Spotted Cow Press, 2006)Wiser Pills (revised edition, Frontenac House, 2008)The Emerald Hour (Ekstasis Editions, 2008)

Source: University of Toronto Libraries: Canadian Poetry Online

Awards 
 Stephan G. Stephansson Award for Poetry – From The Mouths of Angels''

References

External links
 

1952 births
Canadian male poets
Living people
Writers from Lethbridge
Writers from Victoria, British Columbia
University of British Columbia alumni
University of Victoria alumni
20th-century Canadian male writers
21st-century Canadian male writers
20th-century Canadian poets
21st-century Canadian poets